Mačkat is a village in Serbia situated in the municipality of Čajetina, and the district of Zlatibor. As of 2011, it has a population of 905 inhabitants.

References

External links 
  Satellite view of Mačkat
  Mačkat

Populated places in Zlatibor District